Walter Meijer Timmerman Thijssen (28 September 1877 in Yogyakarta, Dutch East Indies – 3 July 1943 in Hilversum) was a Dutch rower who competed in the 1900 Summer Olympics.

He was part of the Dutch boat Minerva Amsterdam, which won the bronze medal in the eight event.

References

External links

 profile

1877 births
1943 deaths
Dutch male rowers
Olympic rowers of the Netherlands
Rowers at the 1900 Summer Olympics
Olympic bronze medalists for the Netherlands
People from Yogyakarta
Olympic medalists in rowing
Medalists at the 1900 Summer Olympics
Dutch people of the Dutch East Indies